Demon Slayer: Kimetsu no Yaiba is an anime series based on the manga series of the same title, written and illustrated by Koyoharu Gotouge. The anime television series adaptation by studio Ufotable was announced in Weekly Shōnen Jump on June 4, 2018. The first season adapts the first seven volumes (chapters 1–54) of the manga series, and it aired from April 6 to September 28, 2019, on Tokyo MX, GTV, GYT, BS11, and other channels. Haruo Sotozaki directed the anime with scripts by the Ufotable staff. Yuki Kajiura and Go Shiina composed the music, and Akira Matsushima is the character designer. Hikaru Kondo is the producer. 

LiSA.

Aniplex of America announced that they have licensed the series, and streaming on Crunchyroll, Hulu, and FunimationNow. AnimeLab is simulcasting the series in Australia and New Zealand. The series ran for 26 episodes and adapted the manga from the beginning of the first volume to the first chapters of the seventh.

Prior to airing, the first five episodes screened theatrically in Japan for two weeks from March 29, 2019, under the title . Aniplex of America screened the film at the Aratani Theatre in Los Angeles on March 31, 2019. Madman Entertainment through AnimeLab screened the film in select theatres in Australia on April 2, 2019.

In July 2019, it was announced that the English dub would premiere on Adult Swim's Toonami block. The English dub premiered on October 13, 2019.


Episode list

Home media release
The series was released in Japan by Aniplex on eleven Blu-ray and DVD volumes beginning on July 31, 2019, and concluded on June 24, 2020. Each volume features cover art illustrated by the series' character designer, Akira Matsushima, and the limited-edition includes bonus CD containing original drama or soundtrack. Aniplex of America released the first limited-edition Blu-ray volume in North America on June 30, 2020, and the second volume was released on November 24, 2020. The company, in partnership with Funimation, released the standard-edition Blu-ray volumes in September 2020 and January 2021.

Japanese

English

Notes

References

2019 Japanese television seasons
Demon Slayer: Kimetsu no Yaiba
Asakusa
Spiders in popular culture
Anime and manga about revenge
Child abuse in fiction
Domestic violence in fiction
Discrimination in fiction
Mass murder in fiction
Fiction about murder